Swansea East is a constituency of the Senedd. It elects one Member of the Senedd by the first past the post method of election. It is one of seven constituencies in the South Wales West electoral region, which elects four additional members, in addition to seven constituency members, to produce a degree of proportional representation for the region as a whole.

Boundaries

The constituency was created for the first election to the Assembly, in 1999, with the name and boundaries of the Swansea East Westminster constituency. It is entirely within the preserved county of West Glamorgan.

The other six constituencies of the region are Aberavon, Bridgend, Gower, Neath, Ogmore and Swansea West.

Assembly members and Members of the Senedd

Voting
In general elections for the Senedd, each voter has two votes. The first vote may be used to vote for a candidate to become the Member of the Senedd for the voter's constituency, elected by the first past the post system. The second vote may be used to vote for a regional closed party list of candidates. Additional member seats are allocated from the lists by the d'Hondt method, with constituency results being taken into account in the allocation.

Election results

Elections in the 2020s

Regional Ballot void votes: 139. Want of an Official Mark (0), Voting for more than ONE party or individual candidate (38), Writing or mark by which the Voter could be identified (0), Unmarked or Void for uncertainty (101)

Swansea East saw the lowest turnout at the 2021 election of any constituency in Wales.

Elections in the 2010s

Regional ballots rejected: 154

Elections in the 2000s

2003 Electorate: 57,252
Regional ballots rejected: 364

The first by-election to the Welsh National Assembly was held on 27 September 2001 following the death of the sitting Labour Party AM, Val Feld.

Elections in the 1990s

Notes

References

Senedd constituencies in the South Wales West electoral region
Politics of Swansea
1999 establishments in Wales
Constituencies established in 1999